Quinssaines is a commune in the Allier department in Auvergne-Rhône-Alpes in central France.

Location 
Located in the west part of Allier department, Quinssaines is also close to the Creuse department.

Adjacent Communes: Huriel, Domérat, Prémilhat, Teillet-Argenty, Viersat, Lamaids, Saint-Martinien

Population

See also
Communes of the Allier department

References

Communes of Allier
Allier communes articles needing translation from French Wikipedia